Frank Türr (born 16 September 1970) is a German former professional footballer who played as a forward.

References

External links 
 

1970 births
Living people
Footballers from Nuremberg
German footballers
Association football forwards
Bundesliga players
2. Bundesliga players
1. FC Nürnberg players
VfL Bochum players
Eintracht Braunschweig players
SpVgg Greuther Fürth players
West German footballers